Miguel Caló (October 28, 1907 – May 24, 1972) was a famous tango bandoneonist, composer, and the leader of the Orchestra Miguel Caló.

He was born in Balvanera, Buenos Aires, Argentina.

Early years
Born in the Buenos Aires neighborhood of Balvanera, he studied violin and bandoneon, working with important orchestras beginning in 1926.

With His Own Orchestras 
Caló formed his first orchestra in 1929, which he then dissolved in order to join the orchestra of the pianist and poet, Cátulo Castillo, with whom he toured in Spain. The brothers Ricardo and Alfredo Malerba as well as the singer Roberto Maida also participated in that tour.

Upon Returning to Buenos Aires Caló formed a new orchestra with the bandoneonist Domingo Cuestas, the violinists Domingo Varela Conte, Hugo Gutiérrez, and Enrique Valtri, the contrabassist Enzo Ricci, and the pianist Luis Brighenti. Caló eventually left this orchestra to join Osvaldo Fresedo's group, with which he toured the United States.

Selected filmography
The Tango Star (1940)

External links
Miguel Caló at todotango.com
Miguel Caló at tango.info
Short biography
Biography

Argentine tango musicians
Argentine composers
1907 births
1972 deaths
Place of birth missing
20th-century composers